Gus Gus Vs. T-World is an album by the Icelandic group Gus Gus, released in 2000 on 4AD Records.

The album is not strictly a Gus Gus recording but a collection of songs written by Biggi Veira and Herb Legowitz when they were called T-World.

Critical reception
CMJ New Music Report praised the "sleek, instrumental grooves" and "melodic techno and downbeat serenading."

Track listing
 "Anthem" – 7:50
 "Northern Lights" – 6:12
 "Earl Grey" – 7:06
 "Purple" – 9:20
 "Rosenberg" – 6:27
 "Sleepytime" – 4:39
 "Esja" – 11:13

A different version of the track "Purple" is on the albums GusGus (1995) and Polydistortion (1997).

A shorter version of "Anthem" appears on the soundtrack to the movie Pi (1998).

References

GusGus albums
2000 compilation albums